8/12 may refer to:

August 12 (month-day date notation)
Unite the Right rally, locally referred to as 8/12, a white supremacist rally in Charlottesville, Virginia
December 8 (day-month date notation)
8/12 (film), an upcoming Bengali film

See also
12/8 (disambiguation)